H11, H-11 or H 11 may refer to :
 H-11 (Michigan county highway)
 British NVC community H11, a type of heath community in the British National Vegetation Classification
 Heathkit H-11, a microcomputer
 , a Royal Navy B-class destroyer
 , a Royal Navy R-class destroyer
 , a Royal Navy H-class submarine
 London Buses route H11, a Transport for London contracted bus route
 Sanguiin H 11, a type of tannin 
 A motor vehicle headlamp bulb type; see List of automotive light bulb types